The Hotel Mouse is a 1923 British silent crime film directed by Fred Paul and starring Lillian Hall-Davis, Campbell Gullan and Warwick Ward. It was based on a play by Paul Armont and Marcel Gerbidon.

Cast
 Lillian Hall-Davis - Mauricette 
 Campbell Gullan - Merchant 
 Warwick Ward - Estaban 
 Josephine Earle - Lola 
 Morgan Wallace - Honorable Harry Hurlingham

References

External links

1923 films
British silent feature films
British crime films
Films directed by Fred Paul
British films based on plays
Films produced by G. B. Samuelson
British black-and-white films
1923 crime films
1920s English-language films
1920s British films